The 2000 Pau Grand Prix was a Formula Three motor race held on 12 June 2000 at the Pau circuit, in Pau, Pyrénées-Atlantiques, France. The Grand Prix was won by Jonathan Cochet, driving for Signature Team. Tiago Monteiro finished second and Patrick Friesacher third.

Entry List

Classification

Qualifying

Group A

Group B

References

Pau Grand Prix
Pau Grand Prix
Pau Grand Prix